Common names: burrowing snakes

Plectrurus is a genus of nonvenomous shield tail snakes endemic to the Western Ghats of South India. Currently, four species are recognized. They inhabit high elevation montane Shola forests and are usually found under fallen logs and rocks. Some species are rare while some are quite common in their range.

Description
Small snakes, they do not exceed 43 cm (17 in).

An ocular shield covers the eye. The eyes are small, diameter not more than half the length of the ocular shield. The tail is laterally compressed. The terminal scute also is laterally compressed, with two superposed points. The points are simple, bifid, or trifid.

Species

*) Not including the nominate subspecies
T) Type species

References

External links

 

Uropeltidae
Snake genera
Taxa named by Auguste Duméril